Sveti Petar u Šumi (archaic ) is a village and municipality (općina) in Istria County, Croatia.

Geography
The population is 1,065 (as of the 2011 census).

History
The settlement in the March of Istria arose around the Benedictine Saint Peter and Paul Abbey, probably founded in the 1130s and first mentioned about 1174/76. The abandoned monastery was dedicated to the Order of Saint Paul the First Hermit by the Habsburg emperor Frederick III with the consent of Pope Pius II in 1459. The present-day Baroque monastery complex was finished in 1731. The Pauline abbey was dissolved by Emperor Joseph II in 1782 but re-established in 1993.

References

External links
  Municipal site
 Central Istria Tourist Board
  Pauline Abbey 

Municipalities of Croatia
Populated places in Istria County